Kemthur Kanthappa Shetty (18 April 1901 – 15 August 1987) was an Indian politician. He was a member of Lok Sabha, the lower House of the Indian Parliament from Mangalore. He was a member of Indian National Congress. Prior to being elected member of parliament, he served as the chairman of the Mysore Legislative Council between 1968 and 1970.

References

External links
 Bioprofile on loksabhaph.nic.in
 Bioprofile on kla.kar.nic.in

1901 births
1987 deaths
Indian National Congress politicians from Karnataka
Members of the Karnataka Legislative Council
Chairs of the Karnataka Legislative Council
India MPs 1971–1977
Lok Sabha members from Karnataka